Hugonia micans is a species of plant in the Linaceae family. It is found in Cameroon and Gabon. Its natural habitat is subtropical or tropical moist lowland forests. It is threatened by habitat loss.

References

micans
Vulnerable plants
Taxonomy articles created by Polbot